Anna Fárová (1 June 1928 – 27 February 2010) was a Czech art historian who specialized and catalogued Czech and Czechoslovak photographers, including František Drtikol and Josef Sudek. She was one of the pioneers of writing on history of photography. Her publishing activities helped to establish photography as an art discipline within the country.

Biography 
Fárová was born in 1928 in Paris, to a Czech diplomat, Miloš Šafránek, and a French professor, Anne Moussu. She spent a part of her early childhood in Paris, the family moved to Plzeň, Czechoslovakia only in the middle of the 1930s. Following her studies at the French gymnasium in Prague she continued studying art history and aesthetics at the Faculty of Arts of the Charles University in Prague. In 1952, she married Czech artist Libor Fára. In 1956, her father arranged a meeting with photographer Henri Cartier-Bresson. The meeting heavily influenced her career. She began working with the Magnum Photos agency, co-founded by Cartier-Bresson, and published a series of monographs in the Czech publishing house Odeon.

She held a number of photo exhibitions across [rague. However, the Communist era Czechoslovak government banned Fárová from working in the country after she became a signatory of the Charter 77 manifesto in the 1970s. Much of her work was published outside of Czechoslovakia during the 1980s, before the Velvet Revolution and fall of communism.

Fárová died of a "serious illness" on 27 February 2010, at the age of 81.

References

Further reading

External links 
Anna Fárová: a life in photography (Czech Radio)
Anna Fárová (Gallery Langhans)
Anna Fárová Multimedia IHNED.cz

1928 births
2010 deaths
Czech art historians
Czech photographers
Charter 77 signatories
Czech people of French descent
Recipients of Medal of Merit (Czech Republic)
Women art historians
Historians of photography
Czechoslovak expatriates in France
Czech women photographers
Chevaliers of the Ordre des Arts et des Lettres
Charles University alumni